Rig (also Romanized as Rīg; also known as Rīg-e Naşrī) is a village in Jask Rural District, in the Central District of Jask County, Hormozgan Province, Iran. At the 2006 census, its population was 36, in 7 families.

References 

Populated places in Jask County